Edvard Skagestad (born 6 July 1988) is a Norwegian footballer who plays as a centre back for Follo. Skagestad played five seasons for Aalesund in Eliteserien and one season for IFK Norrköping in Allsvenskan. He has represented Norway at youth international level.

Early life
Born and raised in Ås, Akershus. Skagestad was involved in athletics while attending senior high school. He initially played Basketball, and did not start focusing on football until around the age of 18. He describes himself as a moderate supporter of Arsenal FC.

Club career
Starting his youth career in his community, Skagestad previously played for Ås IL. Skagestad later played for local club Follo from 2006 to 2010, and he played the cup final against Strømsgodset in 2010, which Follo lost 2–0.

He joined Aalesund ahead of the 2011-season as a free agent. He immediately stated that his goal for the season was to play for a permanent spot. After making a series of good performances in the 2011 pre-season, Skagestad suffered a bout of hamstring-injuries which kept him on the sidelines until late April. He made his debut in the cup-win against Stranda, and his first league debut came later on 29 May in the 2–0 home win against Viking. He was again injured in the 4–0 win over IF Elfsborg but quickly recovered.

During the last half of the 2011 season there was an acute shortage of qualified strikers in Aalesund's squad. Skagestad, who originally was a right back, was then forced to play as a striker and occasionally as a winger. He went on to receive praise for his performance At one point, Skagestad made the starting-eleven as a striker while the actual strikers Sander Post, Didrik Fløtre and Solomon Okoronkwo was referred to the bench. His first goal for the club came on 30 October in a 1–1 away draw against Lillestrøm. The 2011 season ended triumphantly for Skagestad as he was chosen to start, again as a striker, the 2011 Cup final against Brann. A match which Aalesund won 2–1.

In the run-up to the 2012 season, Skagestad was again chosen as a striker, this time due to rampant injuries suffered by Leke James, Demar Phillips and Lars Fuhre. He answered by actively part-taking in defeating Dutch powerhouse FC Twente in the Maspalomas Cup. His strong performances in the pre-season as a striker earned him a starting spot throughout the first half of the season, which again made him target of the local media, who were frustrated by the club's inability to produce an actual striker. Despite being brought to the club as a center back, Skagestad ended up playing most of the matches as a striker. After the home loss against rivals Molde on 6 May, Aalesund's head coach Kjetil Rekdal were facing outside pressure and slowly started utilizing Skagestad as a full back, replacing him as a forward with the Jamaican newcomer Tremaine Stewart. By mid-season however, Skagestad found himself playing midfielder, once again due to injuries devastating the squad. Commentators noted that the full-back had essentially played in every single position except as goalkeeper after arriving at the club.

Skagestad played for Aalesund for three seasons, and played 28 matches when the team finished fourth in the 2013 Tippeligaen, which was his last season. On 29 November 2013 he was presented as a new signing for the Swedish club IFK Norrköping, and he joined the club in January 2014.

Career statistics

References

External links
Profile at altomfotball.no

1988 births
Living people
People from Ås, Akershus
Norwegian footballers
Norway youth international footballers
Association football defenders
Follo FK players
Aalesunds FK players
IFK Norrköping players
Fredrikstad FK players
Kongsvinger IL Toppfotball players
Norwegian First Division players
Norwegian Second Division players
Eliteserien players
Allsvenskan players
Norwegian expatriate footballers
Expatriate footballers in Sweden
Norwegian expatriate sportspeople in Sweden
Sportspeople from Viken (county)